Prabha Kotiswaran is a professor of law & social Justice working at King's College London (KCL), UK.

Career 
Professor Prabha obtained her undergraduate degree from the National Law School of India University, and a doctorate degree from Harvard University, USA. She later practised law at Debevoise and Plimpton, two eminent law firms in New York, USA. She was a lecturer at the School of Oriental and African Studies at the University of London. She joined KCL in 2012.

Research & teaching 
Prabha teaches undergraduate and postgraduate courses at the KCL. These include, but not limited to, Criminal Law, Jurisprudence, and Law & Social Theory. Professor Kotiswaran has published over 35 research papers and many books. She published her first research paper in 2001 titled "Preparing for Civil Disobedience: Indian Sex Workers and the Law."

Selected books 

 Dangerous Sex, Invisible Labor: Sex Work and the Law in India.
 Governance Feminism: An Introduction.
 Sex Work.
 Towards an Economic Sociology of Law.
 Revisiting the Law and Governance of Trafficking, Forced Labor and Modern Slavery.
 Governance Feminism: Notes from the Field.

Awards 

 2011: SLSA-Hart Book Prize for Early Career Academics.
 2014: Leverhulme Prize.

References 

Living people
Year of birth missing (living people)
Academics of King's College London
Harvard University alumni